The Gandapur (Pashto: ګنډہ پور Urdu: گنڈہ پور ) also called Gandapore, is a Pashtun tribe, which is based in  Pakistan and Afghanistan. 

It is a Pathan tribe which lives in the Damaan Valley of Dera Ismail Khan District of Pakistan. The majority of Gandapurs live in Kulachi Tehsil including Kulachi city and its surrounding villages like Luni, Rori, Takwara, Muddy, Kot Zafar Baladasti, etc. The tribe is now, for the most part, absorbed in the other population of the area. The tribe descended from the Afghan highlands to the plains of Damaan during the 17th century. The center of their winter quarters developed into a town in the 19th century, probably because of the trading activities of the tribesmen between Khurasan and India. 

The Gandapur tribe took part in Pathan tribal wars during the 18th century. They also fought against the Sikh Empire (1799-1849). A part of the tribe also lives in Sur Kalay (سور کلے) in Ghazni Province of Afghanistan.

References 

 

 
Pashto-language surnames
Pakistani names